Reventador is an active stratovolcano which lies in the eastern Andes of Ecuador. It lies in a remote area of the national park of the same name, which is Spanish for "exploder". Since 1541, it has erupted over 25 times, although its isolated location means that many of its eruptions have gone unreported.

The largest historical eruption occurred in 2002. No injuries or damage were reported. Its most recent eruption began on 27 July 2008, and it has remained in continuing eruption status (intermittent eruptive events without a break of 3 months or more) as of 15 October 2021.

Reventador is part of a chain of volcanoes in the Cordillera Real, much further east than the main volcanic axis of the region. The volcano rises above the jungles of the western Amazon basin and the flanks are densely clad in forests. The lavas are andesitic.

Reventador is one of the most active volcanoes in Ecuador. In 2020, there were near daily emissions of clouds of ash rising one or two kilometres into the air, occasional crater incandescence, and frequent avalanches of incandescent blocks.

See also

 List of volcanoes in Ecuador
 List of stratovolcanoes

References

 Volcan el Reventador
 Photos of Reventador from August 2005
 Volcanic eruptions with little warning: the case of Volcán Reventador's Surprise November 3, 2002 Eruption, Ecuador

External links

Stratovolcanoes of Ecuador
Active volcanoes
Andean Volcanic Belt
Subduction volcanoes
21st-century volcanic events
Holocene stratovolcanoes
Quaternary South America